Saúl Lorenzo Rivero Rocha (23 July 1954 – 2 July 2022) was a Uruguayan football player and manager, who played as a midfielder.

International career
Rivero made nine appearances for the Uruguay national team from 1974 to 1976.

Honours

As a player 
Peñarol
 Uruguayan Primera División: 1982
 Copa Libertadores: 1982
 Intercontinental Cup: 1982

As a coach 
Progreso
 Primera División: 1989

FAS
 Primera Division: 1994–95, 1995–96

Aguila
 Primera Division: Clausura 2001

Managerial statistics

References

External links
http://www.clubdeportivofas.com/Plantillas/Fichas/DT_Saul_Rivero.html
http://archive.laprensa.com.sv/20010106/deportes/dep3.asp

1954 births
2022 deaths
Uruguayan footballers
Association football midfielders
Uruguay international footballers
Liverpool F.C. (Montevideo) players
Atlético Español footballers
Peñarol players
Club Atlético River Plate (Montevideo) players
Wollongong Wolves FC players
National Soccer League (Australia) players
Uruguayan football managers
Uruguay national football team managers
Club Nacional de Football managers
C.A. Progreso managers
C.A. Cerro managers
The Strongest managers
C.D. FAS managers
C.D. Águila managers
C.D. Luis Ángel Firpo managers
Montevideo City Torque managers
Club Xelajú MC managers
Footballers from Montevideo
Uruguayan expatriate footballers
Uruguayan expatriate football managers
Uruguayan expatriate sportspeople in Mexico
Expatriate footballers in Mexico
Uruguayan expatriate sportspeople in Australia
Expatriate soccer players in Australia
Uruguayan expatriate sportspeople in Bolivia
Expatriate football managers in Bolivia
Uruguayan expatriate sportspeople in El Salvador
Expatriate football managers in El Salvador